Kevin Sivula (born 1979 in Minnesota, USA) is a highly cited American chemical engineer and researcher in the field of solar cells. He is a professor of molecular engineering at EPFL (École Polytechnique Fédérale de Lausanne) and the head of the Laboratory for Molecular Engineering of Optoelectronic Nanomaterials at EPFL's School of Basic Sciences.

Career 
Sivula studied at the University of Minnesota and obtained a bachelor's degree in chemical engineering in 2002. He completed a doctorate with a thesis on "Controlling the morphology of solution-processed bulk heterojunction photovoltaics" in 2007 at the University of California, Berkeley under the direction of Jean Fréchet.

He then joined Michael Grätzel’s group at EPFL as a postdoctoral researcher and investigated photo-electrochemical processes of water splitting.

In 2011, he became tenure track assistant professor and  began an independent research program at EPFL's Institute of Chemical Sciences and Engineering. In 2018, he was promoted to associate professor of chemical engineering. He directs the Laboratory for Molecular Engineering of Optoelectronic Nanomaterials and teaches courses in transport phenomena, chemical product design, and solar energy conversion.

Research 
Sivula's research is dedicated to the understanding and engineering of charge transport and transfer in novel and inexpensive optoelectronic materials, in particular for solar energy conversion. The development of economical and robust semiconducting materials that can be processed by rapid roll-to-roll techniques into high-performance devices represents a significant challenge and is crucial to enabling low-cost global-scale solar energy conversion. Therefore, his research is directed towards understanding composition, crystallinity, self-assembly, and morphology in key systems in order to control the electronic band gap, light absorption, charge transfer, and carrier transport in thin film semiconductors to enable advance device performance. He contributed important research advances in three main areas: Semiconductors for solar-fuel production, understanding and controlling charge transport in thin film organic semiconductors, and solution processing and self-assembly of 2D-semiconductors.

His research was featured on Photonics, Nano Werk, Swiss nation TV RTS, Reuters, Clean Technica, and Futura Sciences.

Distinctions 

Sivula is the recipient of the 2017 Werner Prize by the Swiss Chemical Society Werner Prize, the 2016 Air Liquide Essential Small Molecules Award, the 2011 Prix Zeno Karl Schindler, and the 2007  Graduate Student Gold Award by the Materials Research Society.

He is a member of the American Chemical Society and the Swiss Chemical Society.

In 2020, Clarivate ranked him among the 1000 most highly cited researchers.

Selected works

References

External links 
 
 Website of the Laboratory for Molecular Engineering of Optoelectronic Nanomaterials

1979 births
Living people
University of Minnesota alumni
University of California, Berkeley alumni
Academic staff of the École Polytechnique Fédérale de Lausanne
American chemical engineers